Damnice is a municipality and village in Znojmo District in the South Moravian Region of the Czech Republic. It has about 400 inhabitants.

History
The first written mention of Damnice is from 1353.

Demographics

References

Villages in Znojmo District